In 1883, Somerset County Cricket Club played their second season of first-class cricket. They were captained by Stephen Newton, and played in seven matches, winning only one of them.

Background
Somerset County Cricket Club was formed in 1875, and played irregular county fixtures in the years after that, during which time they struggled to remain financially solvent. Upon their formation, the club had no fixed home ground, and it was declared that they would play "on any ground in the county that may be selected by the committee." However, in 1881, they moved into the newly built Athletic Grounds in Taunton. Although it is widely accepted that Somerset's debut first-class match came in 1882, some records do include earlier matches in 1879 and 1881 against Gloucestershire as being of first-class status. Partly due to the lack of availability of some of their best players, Wisden Cricketers' Almanack described their inaugural 1882 campaign, during which Somerset lost six of their eight fixtures, as "a disastrous season".

The status of Somerset as a first-class county in 1883 was still ambiguous in the contemporary press; while The Sportsman and Wisden included them amongst the first-class statistics, other publications such as Cricket: A Weekly Record of the Game did not.

Squad
The following players made at least one appearance for Somerset in first-class cricket in 1883. Age given is at the start of Somerset's first match of the season (30 July 1883).

County cricket

Summary
Somerset began their season against the Marylebone Cricket Club (MCC) at Lord's in London on 30 July. According to Cricket, neither side was at full-strength, and the bowlers available were particularly weak, resulting in a high-scoring draw. Somerset batted first, and other than Ted Sainsbury, whose batting to score 51 runs was described as "marked by great care and judgment" by the Bristol Mercury, they struggled early on, losing five wickets for 130 runs by lunchtime. However, a century partnership between Joe Ambler (who scored 76) and Francis Terry (54) took Somerset to 302. The match was rain interrupted on both days; Somerset bowled the MCC out for 195 in their first innings, including four wickets from Ambler, but were unable to bowl them out again, leaving the MCC 214 for nine at the end of the match.

Season record

Match log and statistics

Notes and references
Notes

References

Bibliography

External links

1883 in English cricket
English cricket seasons in the 19th century
Somerset County Cricket Club seasons